Karl Schultz (born 6 November 1937) is a German equestrian and Olympic medalist. He was born in Schleswig-Holstein. He competed in eventing at the 1972 Summer Olympics in Munich and at the 1976 Summer Olympics in Montreal.

References

1937 births
Living people
German male equestrians
Olympic equestrians of West Germany
Olympic silver medalists for West Germany
Olympic bronze medalists for West Germany
Equestrians at the 1972 Summer Olympics
Equestrians at the 1976 Summer Olympics
Sportspeople from Schleswig-Holstein
Olympic medalists in equestrian
Medalists at the 1976 Summer Olympics
Medalists at the 1972 Summer Olympics